Callum Montgomery (born May 14, 1997) is a Canadian soccer player who plays for Canadian Premier League side Cavalry FC.

Early life
Montgomery began playing youth soccer at age four with the Nanaimo Soccer Association. Afterwards, he joined the Vancouver Island Wave in 2011. In high school, he helped lead St. Michaels University School to a BC Provincial AA Championship title in 2014, scoring the winning goal in the final and being named tournament MVP.

College career
In 2015, Montgomery began attending the University of North Carolina at Charlotte, where he played for the men's soccer team. He scored his first collegiate goal on October 20, 2015 against the Virginia Tech Hokies. At the end of the season, he was named to the Conference USA All-Freshman Team.

During his sophomore season,he helped the 49ers win the Conference USA regular-season title, and was named a Second-Team CoSIDA Academic All-American, Conference USA All-Academic team, and First-Team CoSIDA Academic All-District.

During his junior season, he was a Second-team CoSIDA Academic All-American, earned CoSIDA Academic All-District, United Soccer Coaches All-South Region Scholar and Conference USA All-Academic honours, and was named to the Second Team All-Southeast Region, was a First Team All-Conference USA and First Team All-State.

In his senior season, he was named a First Team All-American, a First-Team CoSIDA Academic All-American, the Conference USA Scholar-Athlete of the Year, Conference USA Defensive Player of the Year, First-team All-Southeast Region, First-Team All-Conference USA, was named named to the Conference USA All-Tournament team, was as semifinalist for the MAC Hermann Trophy, was a Second-team Senior CLASS Award All-American, First-team Scholar All-American, First-team Scholar All-South Region, Second-team TopDrawerSoccer.com All-American, First-team NCCSIA All-State, and was named Team MVP. He scored 11 goals in 73 appearances, over his four seasons, and was invited to the MLS Combine, ahead of the 2019 MLS SuperDraft. He was named the top centre-back prospect ahead of the draft.

Club career
From 2016 to 2018, he played with the Victoria Highlanders in the Premier Development League, captaining the side in his final two seasons. In 2016, he was named Lake Side Buoys Supporters’ Choice Award as the Highlanders’ player of the year. In 2018, he was named to the 2018 PDL All-League and the PDL All-Western Conference teams.

In January 2019, he was selected in the first round (fourth overall) of the 2019 MLS SuperDraft by FC Dallas. He officially signed with the club in February, after having participated in the club's pre-season and playing five pre-season matches, in which he scored one goal. He spent the 2019 season on loan with the second team, North Texas SC, in USL League One. In February 2020, he was loaned to San Antonio FC in the USL Championship. He made his debut for San Antonio on March 7, 2020, scoring his first goal against the Real Monarchs. After the 2020 season, his contract option was declined by Dallas.

In December 2020, Montgomery's MLS rights were traded to Minnesota United FC in exchange for a fourth round pick in the 2022 MLS SuperDraft and $50,000 in conditional General Allocation Money. In February 2021, he signed a new contract with Minnesota. In June 2021, he was loaned to USL Championship side San Diego Loyal SC for the rest of the 2021 season. In November 2022, Minnesota United declined his club option for the 2023 season.

In February 2023, he signed with Cavalry FC of the Canadian Premier League.

International career
In 2019, he was named to the Canada U23 player pool ahead of qualification for the 2020 Olympics. In 2020, he was officially named to the Canada U23 team for the 2020 CONCACAF Men's Olympic Qualifying Championship, later being re-named to the squad in March 2021 (as the tournament was delayed from 2020 due to the COVID-19 pandemic. He made his debut in the first group game against El Salvador, where he suffered an injury, returning in the semi-final loss to Mexico.

Career statistics

References

External links
 

1997 births
Living people
All-American men's college soccer players
Association football defenders
Canadian soccer players
Charlotte 49ers men's soccer players
FC Dallas draft picks
FC Dallas players
Minnesota United FC players
North Texas SC players
San Antonio FC players
Soccer people from British Columbia
Sportspeople from Nanaimo
USL League One players
USL League Two players
Victoria Highlanders players
USL Championship players
Canadian expatriate soccer players
Expatriate soccer players in the United States
Canadian expatriate sportspeople in the United States
San Diego Loyal SC players
MLS Next Pro players
Cavalry FC players
Canadian Premier League players